The 2022 Chinese Women's Super League, officially known as the 2022 China Taiping Chinese Football Association Women's Super League for sponsorship reasons, was the 8th season in its current incarnation, and the 26th total season of the women's association football league in China. It was held from 7 April to 18 November 2022.

Clubs

Club changes

To Super League
Club promoted from 2021 Chinese Women's Football League
Shaanxi Chang'an Athletic

From Super League
Club relegated to 2022 Chinese Women's Football League
Zhejiang

Name changes
Beijing BG Phoenix F.C. changed their name to Beijing.
Changchun Dazhong Zhuoyue W.F.C. changed their name to Changchun Jiuyin Loans.
Shaanxi W.F.C. changed their name to Shaanxi Chang'an Athletic.

Stadiums and locations

Foreign players
Clubs can register a total of four foreign players (excluding goalkeepers) over the course of the season, but the number of foreign players allowed on each team at any given time is limited to three. A maximum of two foreign players can be fielded at any given time in each match.

League table

Results

Positions by round

Results by match played

Relegation play-offs

Overview

Match

References

External links
Official Website

2022
2021–22 domestic women's association football leagues
2022–23 domestic women's association football leagues
+